Maubin is a town in the Ayeyarwady Division of south-west Myanmar. It is the seat of the Maubin Township in the Maubin District. The population as of 2021 was 51,542. The inhabitants of the town, as well as the district are mainly Bamar and Karen.

During Cyclone Nargis which devastated the Irrawaddy Delta, the Burmese military offered convoys to refugees to Ma-ubin to escape the devastation in the worst-hit areas.

Geography and economy
Rice growing and fishing are the major contributors to the economy. It is a developing  town with growing transportation and communication services.

The town is linked with Yangon, 40 miles (65 km) east, by the Twante Canal which heads east. The canal opened in 1932 and improved the transporting of goods back and forth from the former capital, then known as Rangoon.

Landmarks

Pagodas
The predominant religion in the area is Theravada Buddhism and there are many pagodas within Maubin township:

Paw  Taw  Mu  Pagoda, (formally Myo Oo  Paw  Taw Mu  Ceti) is  an  ancient pagoda situated in the southern part of the town on the Toe River. The old pagoda fell in 2002 following river erosion of the bank but it was rebuilt on 22 May 2005 under government guidance.

The  foundation stone of the  Ceti was laid in 1890.

Other notable pagodas include  Shwephonemyint pagoda and Akyawsulyanmyattonetan pagoda.

Gen. Maha Bandula’s cemetery and monument statue is situated in Maubin District, but is located in Danuphyu Township. Danuphyu Fort was a prominent location of the Anglo-Burmese War and was destroyed by a flood.

Bridges
There are four bridges in Maubin district, including Maubin Bridge, Khattiya Bridge, Pantanaw Bridge and Bo Myat Htun Bridge. Maubin Bridge is a reinforced concrete bridge with a capacity of 60 tons. It is located in Maubin Township and the foundation stone was laid on 4 April 1994. The bridge formally opened on 10 February 1998.

Climate

Education

The town has several universities including University of Computer Studies (Maubin), Technological University, Maubin and Ma-ubin University. University of Computer Studies (Maubin) offers degrees in Bachelor  of Computer Science,  Bachelor  of Computer Technology and post-graduate degrees of Bachelor  of Computer Science, Bachelor  of Computer Technology, Master of Computer Science, Master of Computer  Technology, Master of Information Science and a Diploma  in Computer Science.

Ma-ubin University opened in July 2003.

Dhamma Manorama - meaning ‘Delightful Environment of Dhamma’, is situated a mile away on the main road to Maubin University. It offers 10-day courses in learning and as of May 2005, eight courses had been held in which 349 students participated. Many of the students come from Maubin's No. 1 State High School. The centre was established on 28 March 2004, on some seven acres of land.

The American Baptist Missionary Union had been active in the area at the turn of the 20th century and established a number of churches.

Notable people
 Ba Maw (1893–1977) - Burmese political leader

References

External links
Images of pagodas in Ma-ubin and overview

Populated places in Ayeyarwady Region
Township capitals of Myanmar